Caccobius is a genus of Scarabaeidae or scarab beetles.

Species
Species in this genus include:

 Caccobius anthracites (D'Orbigny, 1904)
 Caccobius aterrimus (Fabricius, 1798)
 Caccobius atratus Walter & Cambefort, 1977
 Caccobius auberti D'Orbigny, 1902
 Caccobius balthasari Tesar, 1969
 Caccobius bama Walter, 2014
 Caccobius bawangensis Ochi, Kon & Kikuta, 1997
 Caccobius bidentatus Boucomont, 1923
 Caccobius binodulus Harold, 1877
 Caccobius boucomonti Balthasar, 1935
 Caccobius brevis Waterhouse, 1875
 Caccobius cabellai Walter, 2019
 Caccobius callosifrons D Orbigny, 1905
 Caccobius castaneus (Klug, 1855)
 Caccobius cavatus D'Orbigny, 1908
 Caccobius christophi Harold, 1879
 Caccobius chujoi Paulian, 1942
 Caccobius corniceps D'Orbigny, 1913
 Caccobius cribrarius Boucomont, 1928
 Caccobius croceocinctus D'Orbigny, 1913
 Caccobius curvicornis Walter & Cambefort, 1977
 Caccobius cuspidiger D'Orbigny, 1913
 Caccobius cyclotis Cambefort, 1984
 Caccobius demangei Boucomont, 1919
 Caccobius denticollis Harold, 1867
 Caccobius devagiriensis Nithya & Sabu, 2013
 Caccobius diminutivus (Walker, 1858)
 Caccobius discrepans (Péringuey, 1901)
 Caccobius dorsalis Harold, 1867
 Caccobius dybowskii D'Orbigny, 1902
 Caccobius elephantinus Balthasar, 1967
 Caccobius excavatus Bai, Zhang & Yang, 2007
 Caccobius ferrugineus (Fahraeus, 1857)
 Caccobius flavolimbatus Balthasar, 1942
 Caccobius foveolatus Frey, 1955
 Caccobius fukiensis Balthasar, 1942
 Caccobius fuliginosus (Roth, 1851)
 Caccobius gallinus (Arrow, 1907)
 Caccobius gananensis D'Orbigny, 1904
 Caccobius genierorum Walter, 2014
 Caccobius gibbosulus D'Orbigny, 1915
 Caccobius gilleti Balthasar, 1933
 Caccobius globaticeps D'Orbigny, 1905
 Caccobius gonoderus (Fairmaire, 1888)
 Caccobius grossegranosus Balthasar, 1963
 Caccobius himalayanus Jekel, 1872
 Caccobius hirsutus Frey, 1958
 Caccobius histerinus (Fahraeus, 1857)
 Caccobius histeroides (Ménetriés, 1832)
 Caccobius histrio Balthasar, 1967
 Caccobius imitans Balthasar, 1932
 Caccobius inconspicuus (Fahraeus, 1857)
 Caccobius indicus Harold, 1867
 Caccobius inops (Péringuey, 1901)
 Caccobius ivorensis Cambefort, 1984
 Caccobius jessoensis Harold, 1867
 Caccobius jossoi Walter, 2014
 Caccobius kelleri (Olsoufieff, 1907)
 Caccobius krikkeni Cambefort, 1980
 Caccobius lateralis D'Orbigny, 1905
 Caccobius leleupi Balthasar, 1963
 Caccobius longipennis D'Orbigny, 1904
 Caccobius maruyamai Masumoto, Ochi & Sakchoowong, 2012
 Caccobius masumotoi Cambefort, 1990
 Caccobius meridionalis Boucomont, 1914
 Caccobius mirabilepunctatus Cambefort, 1971
 Caccobius montreuilli Walter, 2019
 Caccobius morettoi Walter, 2014
 Caccobius mundus (Ménetriés, 1838)
 Caccobius nigritulus (Klug, 1855)
 Caccobius nikkoensis (Lewis, 1895)
 Caccobius obtusus Fåhraeus, 1857
 Caccobius ocellipennis D'Orbigny, 1913
 Caccobius pantherinus 
 Caccobius pentagonus D'Orbigny, 1908
 Caccobius pilosus Frey, 1958
 Caccobius polygonus D'Orbigny, 1911
 Caccobius postlutatus d’Orbigny, 1905
 Caccobius pseudocorniceps Josso, 2018
 Caccobius pseudolaevis D'Orbigny, 1908
 Caccobius pulicarius Harold, 1875
 Caccobius pullus Jekel, 1872
 Caccobius punctatissimus Harold, 1867
 Caccobius reticuliger D'Orbigny, 1904
 Caccobius rufipennis (Motschulsky, 1858)
 Caccobius scheuerni Cambefort, 1990
 Caccobius schreberi (Linnaeus, 1767)
 Caccobius semiaeneus D'Orbigny, 1905
 Caccobius sericeus Frey, 1958
 Caccobius semiluteus d’Orbigny, 1905
 Caccobius sericoides Balthasar, 1966
 Caccobius setifer D'Orbigny, 1905
 Caccobius signatipennis Harold, 1867
 Caccobius sordidus Harold, 1886
 Caccobius suzukii Matsumura, 1936
 Caccobius tai Cambefort, 1984
 Caccobius torticornis Arrow, 1931
 Caccobius tortus (Sharp, 1875)
 Caccobius tuberifrons D'Orbigny, 1902
 Caccobius ugandicus (Frey, 1975)
 Caccobius ultor (Sharp, 1875)
 Caccobius unicornis (Fabricius, 1798)
 Caccobius upembanus Frey, 1958
 Caccobius villiersi Cambefort, 1975
 Caccobius vulcanus (Fabricius, 1801)
 Caccobius zairensis Walter & Cambefort, 1977
 Caccobius zambiensis Walter, 2014

References

Scarabaeidae genera